Sallie Ann Robinson is an American cookbook author, celebrity chef, and cultural historian. A native of Daufuskie Island, South Carolina, she is noted for her knowledge of Gullah traditions and history.

Early life
Robinson was born on Daufuskie Island before natives began selling their ancestral land to private corporations and individuals in the 1960s and began moving inland to surrounding areas in South Carolina, Georgia, Florida, and elsewhere. While she is an author in her own right, Robinson's literary debut actually came as the character named Ethel in Pat Conroy’s classic memoir, The Water Is Wide. She was among the students Conroy taught on Daufuskie Island and maintained a friendship with the author as an adult. Before Conroy's death in 2016, the two sometimes made joint appearances at literary events. Members of Robinson's family are also featured in Daufuskie Island, A Photographic Essay by Jeanne Moutoussamy-Ashe.

Robinson currently splits her time between Hilton Head Island, South Carolina and Savannah, Georgia.

Published works
Robinson's published titles have been acclaimed for the author's mixture of authentic Gullah recipes, home remedies, folklore, memoir, and documentation of the Gullah dialect spoken by island natives. To date, they include the following:

Gullah Home Cooking the Daufuskie Way (University of North Carolina Press, 2003)
Cooking the Gullah Way, Morning, Noon, and Night (University of North Carolina Press, 2007)

References

External links
 Cooking & Living the Daufuskie Gullah Way with Sallie Robinson
 2014 Savannah Food & Wine Festival: Sallie Ann Robinson - Chef and Author
 https://www.thehistorymakers.org/biography/sallie-ann-robinson

African-American women writers
American chefs
American cookbook writers
American food writers
Food Network chefs
Living people
Women cookbook writers
Women food writers
American women non-fiction writers
Year of birth missing (living people)
21st-century African-American people
21st-century African-American women